Kalev Raave (born 20 March 1926 Konguta Parish, Tartu County – 2004) was an Estonian clergyman and politician. He was a member of VII Riigikogu.

Raave married Lydia Majas. His children include actress Rita Raave, theologian and social scientist , and educator .

References

1926 births
2004 deaths
Members of the Riigikogu, 1992–1995
Estonian Lutheran clergy
People from Elva Parish